The Hits is a Compilation album by the Canadian rock band April Wine, released in 1987.
The picture used on this cover is also used on the album covers of First Glance (1978) (American version only), Greatest Hits (1979), and Classic Masters (2002).

Track listing
All tracks written by Myles Goodwyn unless otherwise noted.
 "Say Hello" – 2:59
 "Enough is Enough" – 4:03
 "Just Between You and Me" – 3:55
 "Roller" – 3:36
 "Love Has Remembered Me" – 4:08
 "This Could Be the Right One" – 4:08
 "Sign of the Gypsy Queen" (Lorence Hud) – 4:15
 "What If We Fall in Love" – 4:18
 "Rock Myself to Sleep" (Kimberley Rew, Vince de la Cruz) – 2:57
 "Doin' It Right" (Tom Lavin) – 3:38
 "Tell Me Why" (John Lennon, Paul McCartney) – 3:15
 "Tonite is a Wonderful Time to Fall in Love" – 3:37
 "I'm on Fire for You Baby" (David Elliott) (1974 single) – 3:27
 "You Could Have Been a Lady" (Errol Brown, Tony Wilson) – 3:21
 "Rock n' Roll Is a Vicious Game" – 3:16
 "Like a Lover, Like a Song" – 5:07
 "You Won't Dance with Me" – 3:43
 "Fast Train" – 3:21
 "I Wouldn't Want to Lose Your Love" – 3:09

Personnel
 Myles Goodwyn – lead & background vocals, guitar, keyboards
 Brian Greenway – guitar, vocals, harmonica
 Gary Moffet – guitar, vocals
 David Henman – guitar, vocals
 Steve Lang – bass, background vocals
 Jean Pellerin – bass (on tracks 5 and 9)
 Jim Clench – bass, vocals
 Jim Henman – bass, vocals, acoustic guitar
 Jerry Mercer – drums & percussion, background vocals
 Marty Simon – drums (on tracks 5 and 9)
 Ritchie Henman – percussion, keyboards
 Daniel Barbe – keyboards (on tracks 5 and 9)

Various producers
 Myles Goodwyn – producer
 Mike Stone – producer
 Nick Blagona – producer
 Lance Quinn – producer
 Doug Morris – producer
 Gene Cornish – producer
 Dino Danelli – producer
 Ralph Murphy – producer
 Bill Hill – producer

References

April Wine albums
1987 greatest hits albums
Albums produced by Myles Goodwyn
Albums produced by Mike Stone (record producer)
Capitol Records compilation albums
Aquarius Records (Canada) compilation albums
Albums produced by Nick Blagona